Stanley Howse, better known as Flesh-n-Bone (born June 10, 1973), is an American rapper known as a member of the hip hop group Bone Thugs-n-Harmony. He is the older brother of Layzie Bone and cousin of Wish Bone.

Legal troubles 
In 1998, police reportedly caught Flesh-n-Bone with a loaded sawed-off shotgun at a relative's home and claimed he refused when asked to leave.

Flesh was brought up on charges for parole violation after he pulled a rifle on a neighbor over a heated dispute about Flesh's music being played too loudly. Flesh explained that he had been involved in several altercations that week, many of them on the day, and that the rifle was pulled in his distress. The weapon was pulled out in order to protect himself, Flesh-n-Bone states, though he admits he let his frustration get the better of him and that he pulled the rifle out at a time when it wasn't needed.

In December 1999, Flesh-n-Bone was involved in a dispute with one-time friend Tarrance Vickers. During the dispute, Flesh-n-Bone pulled out a loaded semiautomatic AK-47 rifle and took aim at Vickers. The presiding Van Nuys Superior Court Judge deemed Howse's life story "one of the worst cases of child abuse she had ever read, full of beatings and other physical, emotional, and mental traumas." Flesh-n-Bone apologized and took responsibility for his actions and pleaded guilty. On September 22, 2000, Howse was sent to Pleasant Valley State Prison for 12 years on charges of assault with a deadly weapon and violation of probation. He was also required to undertake an anger-management course.

He was released in July 2008, when he reunited with fellow group members Krayzie Bone, Layzie Bone, Bizzy Bone, and Wish Bone. They immediately went to the studio and started recording for their reunion album Uni5: The World's Enemy, which was released on May 4, 2010.

Flesh-n-Bone was picked up on gun possession charges on Thursday, April 2, 2009, in Santa Clarita, CA, according to TMZ. He was held without bail. However, the gun possession charges against him were dropped on April 20, 2009 in a Santa Clarita courthouse. "The defense turned over some information, and we investigated and realized we were unable to proceed with the charges as filed, so the judge dismissed the case," said Jane Robinson, a spokeswoman for the Los Angeles district attorneys office.

On March 28, 2010, during the Bone Thugs-n-Harmony reunion tour, Flesh-n-Bone was picked up on a 10-year-old felony warrant in Cleveland, Ohio during a show at the House Of Blues. He was released from custody five days later and charges were dismissed.

Discography

Solo albums 
T.H.U.G.S. (Trues Humbly United Gatherin' Souls) (1996)
5th Dog Let Loose (2000)
Blaze of Glory (2011)
Do You (2020) 
To the Bone (2022)

References

External links 
Official website

Living people
African-American male rappers
American hip hop singers
Bone Thugs-n-Harmony members
Gangsta rappers
Horrorcore artists
Rappers from Cleveland
1973 births
21st-century American rappers
21st-century American male musicians
21st-century African-American musicians
20th-century African-American people